János Bókai (1822–1884, full name in Hungarian Idősebb Bókai János) was a Hungarian University professor, pediatrician and the director of a children's hospital in Budapest. He also pioneered rhino-laryngology and the development of laryngoscopy and rhinoscopy.

He wrote the anamnesis of Ignaz Semmelweis which played a role in the admission of Semmelweis to an insane asylum.

References

Monographs

Notes

Hungarian pediatricians
1822 births
1884 deaths